Linn Township is an inactive township in Osage County, in the U.S. state of Missouri.

Linn Township was erected in 1841, taking its name from Senator Lewis F. Linn.

References

Townships in Missouri
Townships in Osage County, Missouri
Jefferson City metropolitan area